Frederick "Fred" Noseworthy (2 May 1871 – 25 February 1942) was a track and field athlete who competed in the 1908 Summer Olympics for Canada. He did not finish the Men's Marathon.

References

External links

1871 births
1942 deaths
Canadian male marathon runners
Olympic track and field athletes of Canada
Athletes (track and field) at the 1908 Summer Olympics